Ivica Dimcevski (born June 27, 1989) is a Macedonian professional basketball player for Feniks 2010 of the Macedonian First League.  He is also member of Macedonia national basketball team.

References

External links
eurobasket.com profile
FIBA profile

1989 births
Living people
KK Rabotnički players
KK Vardar players
Macedonian men's basketball players
Shooting guards
Sportspeople from Skopje